Dunecht is a slightly linear village on the A944 road in north-east Aberdeenshire in Scotland. It is not to be confused with Echt.
  
Dunecht is located 12 miles (19.5 km) west of the city of Aberdeen and is situated by the confluence of the Kinnernie and Bervie burns.

Formerly known as Waterton, it was renamed to Dunecht in the 1820s when the Crawford family built Dunecht House. The estate achieved a certain measure of notoriety in 1881 due to  theft of the remains of the Alexander Lindsay, 25th Earl of Crawford.

Dunecht House, once owned by Viscount Cowdray is now privately owned. Dunecht House is to the south of the village and was once famed for its observatory, ballroom and library, as well as gardens which were opened once a year to the public.

Amenities in the village include a school, a pub (Jaffs), and a garage-come-shop.

References
 AA Touring Guide to Scotland (1978)

External links 

Historic Scotland description of Dunecht Policies 
Official Dunecht Village Website
 Official Dunecht Estates Website

Villages in Aberdeenshire